Naoki Motomura (本村直樹 , born 11 April 1992) is a Japanese rugby sevens player. He competed in the men's tournament at the 2020 Summer Olympics.

References

External links
 

1992 births
Living people
Japanese rugby union players
Male rugby sevens players
Mie Honda Heat players
Olympic rugby sevens players of Japan
Rugby sevens players at the 2020 Summer Olympics
People from Hachinohe
Asian Games medalists in rugby union
Rugby union players at the 2018 Asian Games
Asian Games silver medalists for Japan
Medalists at the 2018 Asian Games
Rugby union wings
Rugby union fullbacks